Nikolaos Pananos (Greek: Νικόλαος Πανανός), born on 29 March 1968 in Athens, is a Greek boccia player with a Paralympic boccia classification of BC3. His specific disability is cerebral palsy. He won the gold medal during the 2012 Summer Paralympics in BC3 mixed pairs along with Maria-Eleni Kordali and Grigorios Polychronidis.  In the 2016 Summer Paralympics he won the bronze medal at the same event.

References 

1968 births
Living people
Boccia players at the 2012 Summer Paralympics
Boccia players at the 2016 Summer Paralympics
Paralympic gold medalists for Greece
Medalists at the 2012 Summer Paralympics
Medalists at the 2016 Summer Paralympics
Paralympic boccia players of Greece
Paralympic medalists in boccia
Sportspeople from Athens